The Briggs & Stratton Raptor series is a line of single-cylinder, four-cycle flathead engines that has been in use since the early 1970s.

Specifications

Raptor I
The Briggs Raptor 1 was an industrial based 5 horsepower flathead model 13 engine.

Raptor II
The second Raptor, released in the 1980s, saw an upgrade to four horsepower standard. This would be the year that Briggs introduced the aluminum-bore dual-bearing block. It had a cast-aluminum connecting rod that decreased internal mass and improved engine life.

Raptor III
Released in 1995, the third and final Raptor, the Raptor III, had five horsepower. The only thing different from the II was that this one had a cast-alloy crank with a carbon-infused piston. This engine sold phenomenally, however, and almost phased out its two predecessors. Hundreds of thousands of these engines remain in service today, and are the best-selling racing engine of all time.

Production counterparts
All Briggs flatheads since the introduction of the II have been designed after the racing engine, most notably the I/C. However these engines have none of the racing parts.

The BlockZilla
The Briggs & Stratton BlockZilla motor is a more advanced form of the earlier Raptor motor. The block is built up to handle  more power. This means that the block is about  heavier and has much more structural integrity. Also the exhaust and intake ports are set on an angle. In all, this motor is built to race, but the Raptors II and III are choice among many race teams.

External links 
 A Briggs Raptor III.

Internal combustion piston engines
Raptor